Paul Singer (16 January 1844, Berlin – 31 January 1911) was a leading Marxist in and representative of the Social Democratic Party of Germany in the late 19th and early 20th centuries. Co-Chairmen of the SPD (which he joined in 1878) along with fellow Marxist August Bebel from 1890 until his death in 1911.

Literature 
 Heinrich Gemkow: Paul Singer – ein bedeutender Führer der deutschen Arbeiterbewegung. Dietz, Berlin 1957.
 Ursula Reuter: Paul Singer (1844–1911). Eine politische Biographie, Düsseldorf: Droste 2004
 Wilhelm Heinz Schröder: Sozialdemokratische Parlamentarier in den deutschen Reichs- und Landtagen 1867–1933. Biographien, Chronik und Wahldokumentation. Ein Handbuch. Düsseldorf, 1995.  S.706

External links
 
Timeline of Singer's life 
 V. I. Lenin, Paul Singer
 Ursula Reuter: Nicht fragen, wer ist der Mann, sondern: Wie ist der Mann. Paul Singer (1844–1911): Bürger, Kaufmann, Sozialdemokrat. 
 Biography of Singer 

1844 births
1911 deaths
Politicians from Berlin
People from the Province of Brandenburg
Jewish German politicians
Social Democratic Party of Germany politicians
Members of the 6th Reichstag of the German Empire
Members of the 7th Reichstag of the German Empire
Members of the 8th Reichstag of the German Empire
Members of the 9th Reichstag of the German Empire
Members of the 10th Reichstag of the German Empire
Members of the 11th Reichstag of the German Empire
Members of the 12th Reichstag of the German Empire